Riccardo Casini (born 2 February 1992) is an Italian football player who plays as midfielder for Arzignano.

Career
In June 2012 Casini moved from Bologna to Parma in a co-ownership deal, with Francesco Finocchio moved to opposite direction. He then moved to Prato on a year-long loan deal.

In June 2013 Parma bought back Finocchio and Bologna bought back Casini. They both had an accounting value of €2 million for both club on 30 June 2013, which Casini signed a 2-year contract. On 12 July 2013 he was signed by Catanzaro.

On 18 July 2014 he was signed by Forlì in temporary deal. He played his 7th game for the club on 31 January 2015, which his loan was turned to definitive deal on the following days on 2 February.

On 19 July 2017, he was signed by Arzachena.

On 5 July 2019, he signed with Rimini. Before the season started, on 5 August 2019 his Rimini contract was dissolved by mutual consent. The next day, he signed with Arzignano.

References

External links
 

1992 births
Living people
Sportspeople from Ferrara
Footballers from Emilia-Romagna
Italian footballers
Association football midfielders
Serie C players
Serie D players
Bologna F.C. 1909 players
Parma Calcio 1913 players
A.C. Prato players
U.S. Catanzaro 1929 players
Forlì F.C. players
S.E.F. Torres 1903 players
F.C. Grosseto S.S.D. players
F.C. Rieti players
Arzachena Academy Costa Smeralda players
Rimini F.C. 1912 players
F.C. Arzignano Valchiampo players